Christopher Stein (born January 5, 1950) is an American musician known as the co-founder and guitarist of the new wave band Blondie. He is also a producer and performer for the classic soundtrack of the hip hop film Wild Style, and writer of the soundtrack for the film Union City, as well as an accomplished photographer.

Music

In 1973 Stein became the guitarist of the Stilettos and began a romantic relationship with Debbie Harry, one of the singers. In the summer of 1974 Stein, Harry, and the band's rhythm section left to start their own group which they eventually called Blondie. They soon became fixtures in the punk and new wave scene centered around CBGB and Max's Kansas City and by the end of the decade achieved international stardom. Blondie broke up in 1982, but reformed in 1997 and has been active off and on ever since. In addition to being the sole writer of the Blondie song "Sunday Girl", Stein co-wrote numerous hits with Harry, including "Heart of Glass", "Dreaming", "Island of Lost Souls", "Rapture", and "Rip Her to Shreds". Stein also ran the Animal Records label between 1982 and 1984.

In 2015, Blondie members Debbie Harry and Chris Stein made a guest appearance alongside The Gregory Brothers in an episode of Songify the News, and they collaborated again to parody the 2016 United States presidential election debates.

Photography
A photographer, Stein documented the early New York City punk music scene, the visual allure of Debbie Harry and Blondie, and his collaborations with artists including Andy Warhol and H.R. Giger. Stein's photography was published most recently in September 2014 by Rizzoli in his book, Chris Stein / Negative: Me, Blondie, and the Advent of Punk.

The book Negative: Me, Blondie and the Advent of Punk was launched with an exhibition at Somerset House in London, which also coincided with the fortieth anniversary of the formation of Blondie. Some of the photographs in Negative have also been published in the Debbie Harry, Chris Stein and Victor Bockris co-authored volume Making Tracks: The Rise of Blondie, first published by Elm Tree, London (1982). Making Tracks was later reissued by Da Capo, New York (1998).

Stein's photography has also been shown in an exhibition at the Morrison Hotel Gallery, West Hollywood in August 2013; in a joint exhibition with Eddie Duggan at the University of Suffolk (April–May 2017), entitled A la recherche du punk perdu, and in an exhibition in a Blondie 'pop-up' shop in London's Camden Market, linked to the 2017 Blondie performance at the Roundhouse.

Personal life
Stein was born to Jewish parents in Brooklyn, New York, on January 5 1950 He grew up in the Midwood section of Brooklyn, and  attended Midwood High School in Brooklyn, but was expelled for wearing long hair. In 1983, Stein was diagnosed with pemphigus vulgaris, a rare autoimmune disease of the skin. He was cared for by his then-partner Debbie Harry and he has since regained normal function. Stein had developed a mild form of the disease, and was able to control it with a program of steroids. Stein was co-host of TV Party, a public-access television cable TV show in New York City, that ran from 1978 to 1982.

While in Blondie, Stein and Harry maintained a romantic relationship but never married. The couple went their separate ways in 1985, but have continued to work together on a professional basis. In 1999, Stein married actress Barbara Sicuranza, with whom he has two daughters, Akira and Valentina.

Stein has not toured with Blondie since 2018 due to heart issues, but has remained an active recording member in subsequent releases, as on Blondie: Vivir en La Habana (2019) and an upcoming Blondie album. About his health condition, he stated: "I've been dealing with a dumbass condition called Atrial Fibrillation or AFib which is irregular heartbeats and combined with the meds I take for it I'm too fatigued to deal," Stein said. Former Sex Pistols bassist Glen Matlock was to fill in for Stein on a UK tour in 2022.

See also
List of Rock and Roll Hall of Fame inductees

References

External links
Chris Stein official website 
Blondie official website
International Pemphigus Foundation
Rednight.net
 
 

1950 births
Musicians from Brooklyn
American new wave musicians
American punk rock musicians
American rock guitarists
American male guitarists
Blondie (band) members
Jewish American musicians
Living people
Jews in punk rock
Midwood High School alumni
Guitarists from New York (state)
20th-century American guitarists